Fucked up may refer to:

 A vulgarism for error
 An obscene expression meaning that a person is unable to function normally due to a high level of intoxication. ("wasted"). Not to be confused with overdose.
A slang term for someone being physically assaulted. ("He was robbed and the mugger fucked him up really bad.")
 SNAFU (Situation Normal, All Fucked Up) or FUBAR (Fucked Up Beyond All Repair), acronyms used in American military slang
Fucked Up, a Canadian art punk band
Fucked Up Friends, an album by American musician Tobacco
Fucked Up Inside, an album by British band Spiritualized

See also
 Fukuppy, former name of a mascot of Fukushima Industries, Japan